Anton syndrome, also known as Anton-Babinski syndrome and visual anosognosia, is a rare symptom of brain damage occurring in the occipital lobe. Those who have it are cortically blind, but affirm, often quite adamantly and in the face of clear evidence of their blindness, that they are capable of seeing. Failing to accept being blind, people with Anton syndrome dismiss evidence of their condition and employ confabulation to fill in the missing sensory input. It is named after the neurologist Gabriel Anton. Only 28 cases have been published.

Presentation
Anton syndrome is mostly seen following a stroke, but may also be seen after head injury. Neurologist Macdonald Critchley describes it thusly:

The sudden development of bilateral occipital dysfunction is likely to produce transient physical and psychological effects in which mental confusion may be prominent. It may be some days before the relatives, or the nursing staff, stumble onto the fact that the patient has actually become sightless. This is not only because the patient ordinarily does not volunteer the information that they have become blind, but he furthermore misleads his entourage by behaving and talking as though they were sighted. Attention is aroused however when the patient is found to collide with pieces of furniture, to fall over objects, and to experience difficulty in finding his way around. They may try to walk through a wall or through a closed door on his way from one room to another. Suspicion is still further alerted when they begin to describe people and objects around them which, as a matter of fact, are not there at all.
Thus we have the twin symptoms of anosognosia (or lack of awareness of defect) and confabulation, the latter affecting both speech and behaviour.

Anton syndrome may be thought of ideally as the opposite of blindsight, blindsight occurring when part of the visual field is not consciously experienced, but some reliable perception does in fact occur.

Causes
It is not known why patients with Anton syndrome deny their blindness, although there are many theories. One hypothesis is that damage to the visual cortex results in the inability to communicate with the speech-language areas of the brain. Visual imagery is received but cannot be interpreted; the speech centers of the brain confabulate a response.

Patients have also reported visual anosognosia after experiencing ischemic vascular cerebral disease. A 96-year-old man, who was admitted to an emergency department complaining of a severe headache and sudden loss of vision, was discovered to have had a posterior cerebral artery thrombosis with consequent loss of vision. He adamantly claimed he was able to see despite an ophthalmologic exam proving otherwise. An MRI of his brain proved that his right occipital lobe was ischemic. Similarly, a 56-year-old woman was admitted to the emergency department in a confused state and with severely impaired psychomotor skills. Ocular movements and pupil reflexes were still intact, but the patient could not name objects and was not aware of light changes in the room, and seemed unaware of her visual deficit.

Diagnosis
Though the patient is blind, they will behave and talk as if they have normal vision. Attention is aroused, however, when the patient is found to collide with pieces of furniture, to fall over objects, and to experience difficulty in finding their way around. They may try to walk through a wall or a closed door on their way from one room to another. Suspicion is still further alerted when they begin to describe people and objects around them who do not exist. Mental confusion may also be seen. Patients with ABS may give excuses for their blindness. They may explain that their inability to see is because of the lack of proper lighting, and they may try their best to prove that they are not blind, thereby putting themselves in danger.

History 
Most cases of Anton syndrome are reported from adults. The European Journal of Neurology published an article in 2007 that examines a case study of a six-year-old child with Anton syndrome and early stages of adrenoleukodystrophy. The child reportedly had abnormal eye movements, would often fall, and would reach for things and often miss his target. When his sight was tested at 20/20 he was still unable to read the large letters on the chart. He denied having headaches, diplopia, or eye pain and seemed unconcerned and unaware of his poor eyesight. Upon examination, his pupils were equal in shape, round, and reactive to light. His mother commented that he developed unusual eye movements and that they had a "roving quality".

Culture and society

Anton syndrome was featured in a two-part episode of the television series House M.D., titled "Euphoria", although it was ascribed to primary amoebic meningoencephalitis, a disease that usually does not cause the syndrome in real life. The syndrome features prominently in the Rupert Thomson novel The Insult. It is also mentioned in the science fiction novel Blindsight, by Peter Watts.

It is mentioned frequently as "Anton's Blindness" as one of the primary metaphors in Raj Patel's The Value of Nothing. In Lars von Trier's film Dogville, the character Jack McKay acts as if he can see but gives many signs he cannot.

The syndrome is also the main theme of the Malaysian movie Desolasi (Desolation), where the patients live in their own world of imagination, while unable to see the real world. It is also mentioned in Oliver Sacks's An Anthropologist on Mars.

See also

References

Further reading 
 

Blindness
Central nervous system disorders
Occipital lobe
Syndromes affecting the nervous system
Diseases named for discoverer